Tomas O'Mostead was an Irish priest in the fifteenth century, the second recorded Archdeacon of Dromore.

References

Archdeacons of Dromore